Saddleback Church is an Evangelical Baptist multi-site megachurch, based in Lake Forest, California. It is the largest church in California, and one of the largest in the United States of America. The church has several campuses in California and around the world.  Weekly church attendance was 23,500 people in 2020. The senior pastor is Andy Wood. It was part of the Southern Baptist Convention (SBC) from its founding until February 21, 2023 when the denomination's executive committee voted to disfellowship the church over its appointment of women with the title of pastor.

History

In 1979, Rick Warren recently graduated in theology, settled with his wife Kay in the Saddleback Valley area of Orange County, California. He began to probe the people in his neighborhood to find out what prevented them from coming to church. The answers that emerged were boredom, distance from everyday life, lack of welcome for visitors, insistence on money and inadequate programs for children. It is with these concerns that the church began in 1980, with a Bible study group, with six people, the pastor Rick Warren and his wife, in their condo. The first  worship service took place in the gymnasium of a high school on Easter Day in 1980. In 1995, it opened its main building in Lake Forest, with a 3,500-seat auditorium. 

In 2003, Saddleback Church, Kay and Rick Warren founded the P.E.A.C.E. Plan, a humanitarian development program for churches.

In November and December 2006, Saddleback Church played host to the second annual Global Summit on AIDS and the Church. The summit featured 60 speakers, including Senators Barack Obama and Sam Brownback.

In 2018, the church said it had baptized 50,000 people since its founding.

On August 16, 2008, Rick Warren arranged a meeting between Senators John McCain and Barack Obama at Saddleback called the Civil Forum on the Presidency. The format of the forum was structured such that Warren first asked Obama a series of questions; he then asked McCain very similar ones subsequently. It was broadcast live on national news networks and streamed online.  Tickets were distributed to the public through a raffle with seats listing as high as $1,000 and the event was sold out.

According to a church census released in 2020, it claimed a weekly attendance of 23,494 people and 15 campuses in different cities. 

In 2022, Andy Wood became senior pastor of the church.

In 2021, the church was audited for compliance by the Southern Baptist Convention, after ordaining three women pastors that year and thus acting contrary to the Convention's confession of faith which believes that the pastoral ministry is reserved for men. As of February 21, 2023, the church was removed from the member list of the SBC because, according to the SBC's executive committee, the church was "not in friendly cooperation with the Convention due to the churches continuing to have a female functioning in the office of pastor."

Beliefs 
The church has a Baptist confession of faith and was a member of the Southern Baptist Convention, until it was removed over the issue of women in pastoral roles, in variance to the Baptist Faith and Message.

In February 2023, Saddleback Church in Lake Forest, California was deemed uncooperative by accepting Stacey Woods, the wife of Andy Woods, as a regular preacher. Her role proved to be controversial because the Southern Baptist statement of faith restricts women from pastoral duties.

Programs
The church offers various programs, such as The Purpose Driven Church (PDC) curriculum and Celebrate Recovery, an addiction recovery support group program.

See also
 P.E.A.C.E. Plan
 Purpose Driven
 List of the largest evangelical churches
 List of the largest evangelical church auditoriums
 Worship service (evangelicalism)

References and notes

External links
Official website

Baptist churches in California
Churches in Orange County, California
Southern Baptist Convention churches
Evangelical megachurches in the United States
Megachurches in California
Lake Forest, California
Christian organizations established in 1980
1980 establishments in California
Baptist multisite churches